Changyi or Chang Yi was the second son of the Yellow Emperor and father of Zhuanxu.

Cities
Changyi, Shandong, county-level city
Changyi District, Jilin City, Jilin
Changxi, also known as Changyi, Chinese lunar deity
Changyi Kingdom (昌邑國, 97 – 74 BC), a kingdom of the Han dynasty

People
Prince of Changyi (died 59 BC), emperor of the Chinese Han Dynasty for 27 days in 74 BC
Chang Yi (actor) (born 1945), Hong Kong actor originally from Huizhou, China
Chang Yi (movie director) (born 1951), Taiwan director

See also
Zhang Yi (disambiguation)